The 1951 season was Dinamo București's third season in Divizia A. For the first time, Dinamo fought for the championship, ending the season 2nd place, with 32 points, the same number as the champions CCA București. The difference was only one goal between the two teams. Constantin Popescu ranked third in the top scorer with 11 goals scored.

On October 13, 1951 Dinamo Sports Park was inaugurated.

Results

Squad 

Standard team: Iosif Fuleiter – Florian Ambru, Caius Novac – Constantin Marinescu, Gheorghe Băcuț, Valeriu Călinoiu (Viliam Florescu) – Iosif Szökő, Carol Bartha, Ion Suru, Nicolae Dumitru, Constantin Popescu (Alexandru Ene).

Transfers 

Dinamo changes the squad a lot, especially because the second team, Dinamo Oraşul Stalin promoted. Seven players from Bucharest were transferred to Braşov. Titus Ozon, Nicolae Voinescu & Marin Apostol moved to Dinamo 2. Instead, Dinamo brought Ion Suru (Locomotiva București), Iosif Szökő (Progresul ICO Oradea), Valeriu Călinoiu (Flacăra București), Alexandru Ene (Metalul București) and Iosif Fuleiter (Ştiinţa Cluj).

External links 
 www.labtof.ro
 www.romaniansoccer.ro

1951
Association football clubs 1951 season
1951–52 in Romanian football
1950–51 in Romanian football